Eurydiopsis is a genus of stalk-eyed flies in the family Diopsidae.

Species
E. brevispinus Feijen, 1999
E. conflata Yang & Chen, 1998
E. glabrostylus Feijen, 1999
E. helsdingeni Feijen, 1999
E. pachya Chen & Wang, 2006
E. porphyria Chen & Wang, 2006
E. pseudohelsdingeni Chen & Wang, 2006
E. sarawakensis Feijen, 1999
E. subnotata (Westwood, 1847)

References

Diopsidae
Diptera of Asia
Diopsoidea genera